Methoxyphenamine (trade names ASMI, Euspirol, Orthoxine, Ortodrinex, Proasma), also known as 2-methoxy-N-methylamphetamine (OMMA), is a β-adrenergic receptor agonist of the amphetamine class used as a bronchodilator.

It acts as an anti-inflammatory in rats.

Chemistry
Methoxyphenamine was first synthesized at the Upjohn company by Woodruff and co-workers. A later synthesis by Heinzelman, from the same company, corrects the melting point given for methoxyphenamine hydrochloride in the earlier paper, and describes an improved synthetic procedure, as well as resolution of the racemic methoxyphenamine.

See also 
 2-Methoxyamphetamine (OMA)
 3-Methoxy-N-methylamphetamine (MMMA)
 4-Methoxy-N-methylamphetamine (PMMA)

References 

Methamphetamines
Phenol ethers
Beta2-adrenergic agonists
Substituted amphetamines